Anderson Francisco Nunes (born 21 January 1982), known simply as Nunes, is a Brazilian footballer who plays as a forward for Gama.

Career
On 10 May 2010 CR Vasco da Gama signed the striker from Esporte Clube Santo André.

Titles
Santo André
São Paulo Juniors Cup: 2003
Brazilian Cup: 2004

Al-Ahli
Saudi Federation Cup: 2006-2007
Crown Prince Cup: 2006-2007

Botafogo-SP
Campeonato Brasileiro Série D: 2015

Brasiliense
Campeonato Brasiliense: 2017

References

External links

Nunes at ZeroZero

1982 births
Living people
Footballers from São Paulo (state)
Brazilian footballers
Association football forwards
Brazilian expatriate footballers
Brazilian expatriate sportspeople in Saudi Arabia
Campeonato Brasileiro Série A players
Campeonato Brasileiro Série B players
Campeonato Brasileiro Série C players
Coritiba Foot Ball Club players
Esporte Clube Santo André players
Clube Atlético Bragantino players
CR Vasco da Gama players
Hatta Club players
Al-Ahli Saudi FC players
Red Bull Brasil players
Associação Desportiva São Caetano players
Avaí FC players
Botafogo Futebol Clube (SP) players
Sport Club do Recife players
Guarani FC players
Associação Portuguesa de Desportos players
Brasiliense Futebol Clube players
Sociedade Esportiva do Gama players
Anápolis Futebol Clube players
UAE First Division League players
Saudi Professional League players